Qi Qi (born Lim Yi Chyi ) is a Singaporean television host and radio deejay. She was prominently a full-time Mediacorp host from 2003 to 2017 but continues to be a radio deejay.

Biography
Lim graduated economics from George Mason University. Upon graduation, she became a radio deejay of 883JiaFM and Radio Singapore International, and later a current affairs host of Mediacorp Channel 8 since 2004, where she got nominated for Most Popular Newcomer in Star Awards 2004 for her first television appearance in Good Morning Singapore.

News/Current affairs programme

Compilation album

Awards and accolades

References

External links

Living people
Singaporean television personalities
Year of birth missing (living people)